John E. Gatchell (November 27, 1945 – July 9, 2004) was an American jazz trumpeter who was prolific in New York City recording studios from the 1970s to the mid-1980s. After serving in the U.S. Navy in the late 1960s, Gatchell became one of the founding members of the horn band Ten Wheel Drive, then Gotham. Gatchell was among the musicians hand-selected by Paul Simon, whom he considered to be the finest studio musicians for the 1981 Simon & Garfunkel Concert in Central Park

Growing up 
Gatchell graduated from Walt Whitman High School, South Huntington, Long Island, New York, around 1963.  He had been a member of the Whitman High School Dance Band, directed by pioneer jazz educator Clem DeRosa.

Selected discography 
 Les Demerle, Spectrum, United Artists Records (1970) 
 Recorded in New York, November or December 1969
 Ten Wheel Drive, Brief Replies, Polydor (1970) 
 Recorded at A&R Studios, New York
 Exuma, Do Wah Nanny, Kama Sutra Records (1971)
 Esther Phillips, From A Whisper To A Scream
 Recorded in New York , July to December 1971
 Joel Kaye and His New York Neophonic Orchestra, New York Neophonic, Paramount Records (1973) 
 Live at Jimmy's, New York, 1972–1988
 New York Neophonic Jazz Orchestra, New Horizons, Vol. 2, Tantara Records (1976) 
 Recorded in New York, 1972–1988
 Esther Phillips, Alone Again Naturally Kudu Records, 
 Recorded in New York, July, September & October 1972
 George Benson, Body Talk CTI Records 6033 
 Recorded in New York, July 17–18, 1973
 Ronnie Foster, On The Avenue, Blue Note Records (1974) 
 Recorded in New York, April 30, 1974 (BN-LA261-G), and May 1, 1974 (BN-LA261-G)
 Bill Watrous, Manhattan Wildlife Refuge, Columbia Records (1974)  
 Recorded in New York, May 1, 2, 3, 1974 (KG33090)
 John Tropea, Tropea, Marlin Records (1975) 
 Recorded in West Orange, New Jersey, 1975 (Marlin 2200)
 Bill Watrous, The Tiger of San Pedro, Columbia Records (1975) 
 Recorded in New York, 1975 (Col PC33701)
 Chick Corea, The Leprechaun, Polydor (1976) 
 Recorded in New York, 1975 (Polydor PD6062)
 Esther Phillips, What a Diff'rence A Day Makes, Kudu Records, CTI Records
 Recorded in New York, April, 1975 (Kudu KU-23; CTI 63036)
 Eumir Deodato, Very Together, MCA Records (1976) 
 Recorded in New Jersey, 1976 (MCA 2219)
 Blue Mitchell, Funktion Junction, RCA Records 
 Recorded in Hollywood, California, February 17, 1976 (RCA APL1-1493)
 Joel Kaye, Jazz in Concert, Sandcastle Records (1976) 
 Recorded in New York, circa July 1976 (Sandcastle LP1033)
 Lalo Schifrin, Towering Toccata, CTI Records (1977) 
 Recorded in Englewood Cliffs, New Jersey, October/December 1976 (CTI 7-5003)
 Grover Washington, Jr., A Secret Place, Kudu Records 
 Recorded in New York, October 1976 (Kudu KU-32; Motown 5165 – CD)
 Bob James, BJ 4, CTI Records (1977) 
 Recorded in New York, November/December 1976 (CTI 7074)
 Eumir Deodato, Love Island, Warner Bros. Records (1978) 
 Recorded in New York, 1977 (Warner Bros. Records BSK3132)
 Pee Wee Ellis, Home in the Country, Savoy Records (1977) 
 Recorded in New York, October–December 1976 & January 1977 (Savoy SJL3301)
 Art Webb, Love Eyes, Atlantic Records (1977) 
 Recorded in New York, May 1977 (Atlantic SD18226)
 David Matthews, Dune, CTI Records (1977) 
 Recorded in New York, June 1977 (CTI 7-5005)
 Idris Muhammad, Boogie To The Top, Kudu Records (1978) 
 Recorded in New York, December 1977 (Kudu KU38)
 Phil Upchurch, Marlin Records (1978) 
 Recorded in New York, 1978 (Marlin 2209, 3325)
 Michel Legrand & Company, Le Jazz Grand, Gryphon Records (1978) 
 Recorded in New York, March 1978 (Gryphon G786)
 Eumir Deodato, Knights Of Fantasy, Warner Bros. Records (1979) 
 Recorded in New York, circa 1979 (Warner Bros. Records BSK3321)
 David Chesky, Rush Hour, Columbia Records (1989) 
 Recorded in New York, 1980 (Columbia JC36799)
 Earl Klugh, Late Night Guitar, Liberty Records (1980) 
 Recorded in Los Angeles & New York, 1980 (Liberty LT1079)
 The Michael Zager Band, Let's All Chant, Private Stock Records (1978) 
 Recorded in New York, circa 1978s (PS7013)
 David Matthews, Grand Connection, Electric Bird Records (1983) 
 Recorded in New York, December 1 & 15, 1982
 Barbara Rankin, It's Been A Long, Long Time, Efvee Records (1983) 
 Recorded in New York, November 7–9, 1983 (EfVee 001)
 Corky Hale, Harp Beat, Stash Records (1985) 
 Recorded in New York, 1985 (ST245)

References 

1945 births
2004 deaths
American jazz trumpeters
American male trumpeters
Crossover jazz trumpeters
Hard bop trumpeters
Jazz-pop trumpeters
20th-century American musicians
20th-century trumpeters
20th-century American male musicians
American male jazz musicians